Lü Xiaojun (born 27 July 1984) is a Chinese weightlifter. He is a three-time Olympic champion and five-time world champion competing in the 77 kg category until 2018 and 81 kg starting in 2018 after the International Weightlifting Federation reorganized the categories.

Early life
Lü was born in a village administered by Qianjiang City, Hubei Province. His father, Lü Yuan, and the rest of his family were impoverished peasants. Contrary to popluar belief, Lu's athletic career started out as a short-distance track and field sprinter and he didn't begin specific weightlifting training until he was 14. After winning a local elementary school track and field meet at the age of 12, he was scouted by the county-level track and field coaches and asked to join the team. But Lu led a rather short career as a young sprinter. At a 200 metre meet where he was placed 6th in 1998, Lu was scouted by his first weightlifting coach Deng Minghu who noted that Lu, though lacking endurance for short-distance sprinting, was extremely explosive and powerful out of the block and at the early part of the race and had favorable physque for the sport of weightlifitng. Lu, who was already 14 at this point, was then invited by Deng to join the Qian Jiang city youth athletic school to start training as a weightlifter. In 1999, to remove the financial burden on Lü's family, his coach Dengling Hu sent him to join the provincial team.

Weightlifting career
In 2003 Lü represented the Hubei provincial team in the Chinese national weightlifting championships, competing at 69 kg. He won the bronze total for his class. The same year, due to his outstanding performance, he was recruited by the Chinese national team. In 2006 due to ligament injuries in his shoulders and legs, he left the national team. In 2008, after the 2008 Summer Olympics, Lü renewed his training in the national team with coach Yu Jie. 

He has set thirteen senior world records throughout the course of his career, seven at –77 kg and six at –81 kg.

In 2022 he tested positive for EPO.  As a result, he was provisionally suspended from competing, pending "resolution of the matter".

Olympics
Heading into the 2012 Summer Olympics Lü was the heavy favorite to win. He ended up winning the gold medal at the 2012 Summer Olympics in the 77 kg class with a total of 379 kg. His snatch of 175 kg set both a world and Olympic record, as did his total of 379 kg, for the 77 kg class. Due to the confusion between Lü and his opponent Lu Haojie's family name,  Lü was unable to attempt his third lift of snatch at 177 kg.

He was again the heavy favorite to win gold at the 2016 Summer Olympics. He finished the snatch phase with a new world record of 177 kg, but did not win gold due to Nijat Rahimov's clean and jerk world record of 214 kg. Lü and Rahimov had the same total, but Rahimov won due to virtue of a lighter body weight.
However, due to the doping offences of Rahimov, the gold medal was stripped and Rahimov was disqualified, Lü regained the gold medal in 2022. 

At the 2020 Summer Olympics, Lü dominated the newly established men's 81 kg weightlifting competition by lifting 170 kg and 204 kg in the snatch and clean & jerk phases respectively for a total of 374 kg to win the gold medal. By winning this title, Lü became the oldest weightlifting champion in the history of modern Olympic Games at 37.

World Championships
In 2009 he won his first World Weightlifting Championships where he set new Snatch and Total world records. Looking to repeat in 2010 he ended up being the silver medalist, but returned in 2011 to win gold for the second time.

Lü won 3 gold medals in the 77 kg class at the 2013 World Weightlifting Championships.  He broke his own world record in the snatch with a lift of 176 kg.  He also completed a 204 kg clean and jerk, setting a new world record total of 380 kg.

At the 2015 World Weightlifting Championships he won the gold medal in the snatch, but was unable to complete a clean and jerk which eliminated him from winning a fourth world championship.

In 2018 the International Weightlifting Federation updated the weight classes, and he competed in the newly created 81 kg division. The 81 kg division saw 5 world records set and 11 junior world records set. In the snatch portion, Lü initially set the snatch world record of 172 kg, then Mohamed Ihab in his next attempt lifted 173 kg setting a new world record. In the clean & jerk portion, Mohamed Ihab set 2 new world records in the total with his first two lifts, but he was unable to lift his final clean & jerk of 203 kg. This allowed Lu to win gold with his 202 kg clean & jerk, setting a new world record total of 374 kg, out lifting Mohamed Ihab by 1 kg.

In the 2019 Championships held in Thailand, Lu again won gold in the 81 kg category, setting a new world record of 378kg total (171kg snatch and 207kg clean & jerk).

Lu did not compete in the 2022 World Weightlifting Championships held in December 2022, which was won by his compatriot Li Dayin.

Doping ban
In December 2022, it was revealed that Lu had tested positive during an out-of-competition testing for the use of blood booster hormone EPO in a blood sample collected on 30 October 2022. Lu denied taking any prohibited substance and can request that a backup sample B be tested. Lu has been provisionally suspended until the issue is resolved.

Personal life
Lü married his long-term girlfriend Guo Xiyan, a former world class weightlifter herself, in December 2013. They have two children together, one born in August 2014.

Major results

WR: World record
OR: Olympic record

References

External links

Athlete profile on The-Sports.org

1984 births
Living people
People from Qianjiang
Weightlifters from Hubei
Chinese male weightlifters
Olympic weightlifters of China
Weightlifters at the 2012 Summer Olympics
Weightlifters at the 2016 Summer Olympics
Olympic gold medalists for China
Olympic medalists in weightlifting
World record holders in Olympic weightlifting
Medalists at the 2012 Summer Olympics
2016 Olympic silver medalists for China
World Weightlifting Championships medalists
Weightlifters at the 2014 Asian Games
Asian Games medalists in weightlifting
Asian Games gold medalists for China
Medalists at the 2014 Asian Games
Weightlifters at the 2020 Summer Olympics
Medalists at the 2020 Summer Olympics
20th-century Chinese people
21st-century Chinese people